Walter Henry (born 28 July 1937) is a Canadian boxer. He competed at the 1964 Summer Olympics and the 1968 Summer Olympics. In 1964, he was eliminated in his first bout by Constantin Ciucă of Romania. At the 1968 Summer Olympics, he received a first-round bye but then lost his bout to Joseph Destimo of Ghana.

References

1937 births
Living people
Flyweight boxers
Canadian male boxers
Olympic boxers of Canada
Boxers at the 1964 Summer Olympics
Boxers at the 1968 Summer Olympics
Boxers at the 1967 Pan American Games
Pan American Games bronze medalists for Canada
Pan American Games medalists in boxing
Boxers at the 1958 British Empire and Commonwealth Games
Commonwealth Games competitors for Canada
Boxing people from Ontario
People from Orillia
Medalists at the 1967 Pan American Games